El Gran Calavera ( The Great Madcap) is a 1949 Mexican comedy film directed by Luis Buñuel. The plot concerns a family patriarch who fakes losing all his wealth to end his family's self-indulgent ways.

Plot

Everyone takes advantage of Ramiro de la Mata (Fernando Soler), a funny drunkard and rich widower. His daughter Virginia (Rosario Granados), and his son Eduardo (Gustavo Rojo), as well as his lazy brother Ladislao (Andrés Soler), and his sister-in-law Milagros (Maruja Grifell), all do nothing while living at Ramiro's expense. Gregorio (Francisco Jambrina), his other brother tries to help him by making everyone believe that Ramiro is financially ruined, forcing the family to look for jobs of their own.

Cast

See also
 Nosotros los Nobles, a 2013 Mexican film that reuses the plot.

References

External links
 

1949 films
Mexican comedy films
1940s Spanish-language films
Films directed by Luis Buñuel
1949 comedy films
Mexican black-and-white films
1940s Mexican films